Blackmore Pond is a  reservoir in Wareham, Massachusetts, United States, in the South Wareham section of town. The pond is located south of Horseshoe Pond and west of the Weweantic River. Interstate 195 runs southeast of the pond.

External links
Environmental Protection Agency

Wareham, Massachusetts
Lakes of Plymouth County, Massachusetts
Reservoirs in Massachusetts